The Östliche Marzellspitze is a mountain in the Ötztal Alps on the border between Tyrol, Austria, and South Tyrol, Italy.

References 
 Walter Klier, Alpenvereinsführer Ötztaler Alpen, München 2002, 
 Alpenvereinskarte 1:25.000, Blatt 30/1 Ötztaler Alpen, Gurgl

External links 

Mountains of the Alps
Mountains of Tyrol (state)
Mountains of South Tyrol
Alpine three-thousanders
Ötztal Alps
Austria–Italy border
International mountains of Europe